Valdez is an unincorporated community located in Taos County, New Mexico, United States situated along the Rio Hondo. Valdez had a post office until August 28, 2010; it still has its own ZIP code, 87580.

References

Unincorporated communities in Taos County, New Mexico
Unincorporated communities in New Mexico